Boreč is a municipality and village in Mladá Boleslav District in the Central Bohemian Region of the Czech Republic. It has about 300 inhabitants.

Administrative parts
The village of Žebice is an administrative part of Boreč.

References

Villages in Mladá Boleslav District